Theodor Christoph Schüz (26 March 1830, Waldachtal - 17 June 1900, Düsseldorf) was a German painter associated with the Düsseldorfer Malerschule.

Biography 
He was the youngest son of an evangelical pastor. He was originally trained to be a notary in Herrenberg, but later began studying art in Stuttgart. In 1856, he continued his studies at the Academy of Fine Arts, Munich. There, he became a master student of the history painter, Carl von Piloty.

In 1866, he moved to Düsseldorf, where he would remain for the rest of his life. His sons, Friedrich (1874-1954) and Hans (1883-1922) also became painters. His other son, Martin (1877-1945), was an evangelical pastor in Haigerloch, but was also an amateur watercolorist.

He gained his widest audience as an illustrator of the early works of Ottilie Wildermuth. His best known work, "Noon Prayer at the Harvest", now at the Staatsgalerie Stuttgart, was originally exhibited at the Exposition Universelle (1867). Most of his paintings are in the Late Romantic style, and many are of a religious nature.

References

Further reading 
 Elisabeth Hipp, Jörg Becker, Wolf Eiermann: Theodor Schüz 1830-1900, exhibition catalog, Stadtmuseum Tübingen, Galerie Albstadt 2000, .
 Hans Albrecht Oehler, Martina Röben: Theodor Schüz. Edition Schlichtenmaier, Grafenau 1996, .
 David Koch: Theodor Schüz. Ein Maler für das deutsche Volk. Stuttgart: Steinkopf 1908.

External links 

 More works by Schüz @ ArtNet
 

1830 births
1900 deaths
19th-century German painters
19th-century German male artists
German landscape painters
German genre painters
Düsseldorf school of painting
Academy of Fine Arts, Munich alumni
People from Freudenstadt (district)